Monika Mularczyk (born 28 June 1980) is a Polish football referee.

She has been on the FIFA International Referees List since 2008.

In January 2015 she was promoted to the UEFA Elite Group. In 2017 she was selected as one of the match officials for the UEFA Women's European Championships held in the Netherlands. She became the first Polish female referee to be selected for a senior international tournament.

Notable international tournaments
 2013 UEFA Women's Under-19 Championship (includes the gold medal match)
 2016 FIFA U-20 Women's World Cup
 UEFA Women's Euro 2017

Personal life
She is married and has a son. Her husband is also a football referee.

References

External links
 Profile at 90minut.pl (Polish)
 Profile at WorldFootball.net 
 Profile at Soccerway.com

Living people
1980 births
People from Skierniewice
Polish football referees
Women association football referees